Rare Bird is the debut album by independent American singer-songwriter Whitton. It was released in 2011 in the United States and nominated for Best Pop Album by the Independent Music Awards. The 10-track album was mixed by producer-engineer Michael James.

In 2012, the song "All I Want to Do" was used in the comedy film She Wants Me with Hilary Duff and Charlie Sheen. "Monster" was used in the indie horror flick Among Friends.

Track listing

References

External links
 

Whitton (singer-songwriter) albums
2011 debut albums